The timeline of Puri lists the important historical dates for the town of Puri in Orissa.

Timeline
1042 AD – Introduction of  the Madala Panji (scripture of Orissa) from the Puri Temple.
 1229 – Puri is known as Purusottama Kshetra.
1934 – Nilachala Saraswata Sangha, religious organization established by Swami Nigamananda
1948 – Puri integrated into Odisha.
1957 – Chintamani Panigrahi(former Governor of Manipur) was elected to the 2nd Lok Sabha from Puri constituency

Puri district
Histories of cities in India
Puri
History of Odisha